is a concrete Gravity dam in Sapporo, Hokkaidō, Japan situated upon the Otaru River. It supports a 120 MW hydroelectric power station.

References

Dams in Hokkaido
Minami-ku, Sapporo
Buildings and structures in Sapporo
Dams completed in 1989